The atrial branches of right coronary artery derive from the right coronary artery and provide part of the blood supply to the right atrium and left atrium.

Although named for the right coronary artery in Terminologia anatomica, a portion of the blood supply to the atria derives from the Circumflex branch of left coronary artery.

External links
 Image

Arteries of the thorax